Eupithecia quakerata is a moth in the family Geometridae first described by Pearsall in 1909. It is found in the US states of Colorado, Utah, New Mexico, Arizona and California.

The wingspan is about 18 mm. The forewings are brownish to deep gray in color.

References

Moths described in 1909
quakerata
Moths of North America